The  is an automated guideway transit line operated by  which operates between Shin-Sugita in Isogo Ward to Kanazawa-Hakkei in Kanazawa Ward in Yokohama. It opened on July 5, 1989.

The operator company was called  until the name change on October 1, 2013.

Accident 

On 1 June 2019 at 20:15 (JST), a train ran in the opposite direction and collided with a bumping post, injuring about 20 passengers at Shin-Sugita Station.

Station list

References

External links 

 Official English website
 Official website 

 
People mover systems in Japan
Railway lines opened in 1989
1989 establishments in Japan